The Heraklion Football Clubs Association ( or Ε.Π.Σ.Η.) is an association responsible for administering football in the region of Heraklion. It is based in the city of Heraklion and is a member of the Hellenic Football Federation. The association is responsible for organizing regional Championship and Cup competitions for both adult and youth teams playing in its divisions.

The association is currently one of the largest Football Clubs Associations in Greece, consisting of over 85 clubs. Its colors are blue and white and its crest features a Griffin, the official seal of the Municipality of Heraklion.

History 
During 1925−1929, Heraklion football was dominated by the two major sporting clubs of the time, EGOI (est. 1924) and OFI (est. 1925). In the autumn of 1926, the first football league in Heraklion was organized and held with a limited number of participants, mainly feeder clubs for EGOI and OFI. This first, informal competition was won by EGOI, and was organized again two years later in 1928, when it was won by OFI. In the meantime, several initiatives for the establishment of football clubs that would compete with OFI and EGOI were carried out during 1928−1932. This rapid establishment of football clubs during 1925−1931 (e.g. Ergotelis and Olympiakos Heraklion in 1929, Iraklis Heraklion in 1930 and Ermis in 1932) birthed the need to create a governing body for the coordination and organization of football clubs and competitions. Therefore, the Cretan Football Association was established in 1929. Two years later, and after several disputes over administration issues among the founding members, the union was reformed into the Heraklion Football Clubs Association, which was granted the full administrative and organizational control over the football events in the regions of Heraklion and Lasithi. The association was officially recognized by the HFF in 1931.

Football League System 

The Heraklion FCA football league system consists of four divisions, namely the A1 Division, the top-level football league in Heraklion (therefore also known as the Heraklion FCA Championship), the Α2 Division, second tier in the pyramid, the B Division comprising two Groups and constituting the third tier of the league system and finally the C Division, lowest regional division organized in Heraklion.

From its foundation to 1959 (they year of the foundation of the nationwide championship of the Alpha Ethniki), the Heraklion FCA organised a league that was considered the top tier of football in Crete, and later specifically the region of Heraklion (after Chania, Lasithi and Rethymno founded Football Clubs Associations of their own.

2018−19 season
The following teams compete in the Heraklion FCA Championships during the 2018–19 season. The winner of the A1 Division Championship earns promotion to the Gamma Ethniki, the third tier of the Greek football league system.

A1 Division

A2 Division

B Division

C Division

List of Champions

Informal (prior to the FCA)

Formal FCA Championship (1930−1959)

FCA Championship A1 Division (1959−current)

Performance by club (1925−)

Source:

1. Currently a member of the Lasithi Football Clubs Association.

Cup 

The Heraklion FCA Cup is a football competition in which the clubs competing in any of the Heraklion FCA Football Leagues participate. The competition was founded in 1971, and has since been held annually. As of 2018, the winner of the FCA Cup becomes eligible to participate in next year's Greek Football Cup competition.

Format
The current format features a minimum of 60 clubs. Participation of the teams competing in the A1 and A2 FCA Divisions along with the registered members of the FCA competing in the Gamma Ethniki is mandatory. Optionally, clubs competing in the FCA B and C Division may also participate, along with amateur outfits of professional registered members of the FCA. Teams are drawn at random to compete in single knockout matches, in which the club being drawn first is declared the home team. In case of a match-up between clubs playing at different competition levels, the club playing in the lower Division is declared the home team instead. This format is followed until the Semi-finals of the competition.

The Semi-finals are contested in double knock-out matches between the 4 remaining teams, and match-ups are determined by random draw. The two pairs of teams play each other home and away. In this case, away goals rule is in effect on the qualification, without however excluding the possibility for extra time or penalty shootout in the second leg.

The competition Final is contested by the qualifying teams of the Semi-finals. The Final is single match. In case of a draw, extra time is not held, but the winner is declared in an immediate penalty shootout.

List of Heraklion FCA Cup Winners

Performance by Club (1971−)

1. Currently a member of the Lasithi Football Clubs Association.

Source:

Super Cup 

The Heraklion FCA Super Cup is a football one match competition, which is contested annually by the Heraklion FCA A1 Division champion, and the winners of the Heraklion FCA Cup. In case of a double winner, the Super Cup is contested between the winner and runner-up of the FCA Cup.

The matches

Source:

Heraklion FCA Clubs National Titles & honours

Contemporary 
Greek Cup Winners: (1)
 OFI Crete (1): 1986–87
Football League Winners: (4)
OFI Crete (3): 1965–66, 1975–76, 2017–18
Ergotelis (1): 2005–06
Gamma Ethniki Winners: (4)
OFI Crete (1): 2015–16
Ergotelis (2): 1965–66, 2016–17
Irodotos (1): 2017–18
Greek Amateur Cup Winners: (3)
Ergotelis (1): 1982−83
PANO Malia (1): 1999−2000
Irodotos (1): 2016−17
Amateurs' Super Cup Winners: (1)
Irodotos (1): 2016–17

Defunct 
Delta Ethniki Winners: (9)
Ergotelis (2): 1984–85, 1995–96
Irodotos (2): 1991−92, 2003–04
Atsalenios (2): 2002−03, 2012–13
Poseidon Heraklion (1): 1990–91
Olympiakos Chersonissos (1): 2007−08
Rouvas (1): 2010−11

Heraklion FCA clubs in European competitions

Heraklion FCA Clubs European Titles & honours

Defunct 
Balkans Cup Winners: (1)
 OFI Crete: 1989

References

External links 
 

Association football governing bodies in Greece
Sport in Crete